South Sudbury was a commuter rail station in Sudbury, Massachusetts. It was located at the junction of the Central Massachusetts Railroad and the Framingham and Lowell Railroad slightly north of Boston Post Road (U.S. Route 20) in South Sudbury. The Boston and Maine Railroad station was incorporated into the MBTA Commuter Rail through subsidies in 1965. The station was closed in November 1971 when the branch's last remaining round trip was discontinued. The 1952-built station building was a private business until its closure in 2019, and the building is now abandoned.

History

The Framingham and Lowell Railroad (F&L) opened between its namesake cities on October 1, 1871.  Its South Sudbury station and freight house were located on the east side of the tracks, on the north side of Boston Post Road.

The Central Massachusetts Railroad (CM) opened from Boston to Hudson, Massachusetts in October 1881.  After going out of business in 1883, it was reopened by the Boston and Lowell Railroad (B&L) in 1885, which was, in turn, acquired by the Boston and Maine Railroad (B&M) in 1887.

The Old Colony Railroad, which had acquired the F&L in 1879, constructed a union station at the southeast corner of the junction of the two lines around 1887-91.  This Victorian-style station included a three-story tower.  The Old Colony Railroad was leased by the New York, New Haven and Hartford Railroad (often referred to as just the "New Haven Railroad") in 1893, making South Sudbury one of a small number of stations which served both of New England's two largest railroads.

Passenger service ended on the F&L in 1933 (although freight service between South Sudbury and West Concord lasted until 1982, and between South Sudbury and Framingham Centre into the 1990s).  Service on the CM past Clinton ended in 1932 and on the branch to Marlborough in 1939; by 1950, there were just four daily round trips.  With such drastically-reduced traffic levels, it was no longer economical for the B&M to maintain the large Union Station.  A small wooden station was built around 1952; after failed attempts to move and preserve it, Union Station was demolished, with portions of the interior auctioned off to collectors.

The Massachusetts Bay Transportation Authority was formed in August 1964 to subsidize suburban commuter rail service.  On January 18, 1965, services were cut back to the boundaries of the MBTA funding district.  Although the MBTA initially intended to discontinue the single remaining trips on the Central Massachusetts Branch and the Lexington Branch, they were kept at the last minute.  However, the remaining CM trip was cut from Hudson to South Sudbury.  On November 26, 1971, the remaining South Sudbury round trip was discontinued due to poor track conditions and dwindling ridership.  The circa-1952 station building is still extant, and was in use as a private business, AAA Limousines, until 2019.  Part of the platform and a station sign reading "Sudbury"  remain at the building.

References

External links

 The diamond at South Sudbury (date unknown)

MBTA Commuter Rail stations in Middlesex County, Massachusetts
Former MBTA stations in Massachusetts
Sudbury, Massachusetts
Railway stations in the United States opened in 1881
Railway stations closed in 1971
1971 disestablishments in Massachusetts
1881 establishments in Massachusetts